I'm in the Mood may refer to:

 "I'm in the Mood" (CeCe Peniston song), 1994
 "I'm in the Mood" (John Lee Hooker song), 1951
 I'm in the Mood (album), a 1983 album by Little Willie Littlefield
 "I'm in the Mood", a song by Raffi from the 1982 album Rise and Shine

See also
 In the Mood (disambiguation)
 I'm in the Mood for Love (disambiguation)